Howard James (18 November 1923 – 14 March 2000) was a British rower. He competed in the men's coxed pair event at the 1948 Summer Olympics.

References

1923 births
2000 deaths
British male rowers
Olympic rowers of Great Britain
Rowers at the 1948 Summer Olympics
Place of birth missing